Uco van Wijk (20 May 1924, Jogjakarta, Dutch East Indies – 10 August 1966) was a Dutch astronomer and educator who founded the astronomy program at the University of Maryland and was instrumental in bringing Gart Westerhout from the Netherlands to become Department Head.

Honors
 The crater Van Wijk on the Moon is named after him.
 The astronomy library at the University of Maryland is named after him.
 The Sundial  located in the center of McKeldin Mall on the campus was originally a gift from the Class of 1965, the Department of Physics and Astronomy, and friends of Professor Uco Van Wijk. It was renovated with donations from the Class of 1990.

References

Obituary by Bart Bok in the Quarterly Journal of the Royal Astronomical Society.

1924 births
1966 deaths
Dutch academics
20th-century Dutch astronomers
People from Yogyakarta
University of Maryland, Baltimore faculty
Dutch people of the Dutch East Indies